

Cain

Calamity King

Calamity King (E. Davis Ester) is a superhero from the 30th century in the DC Universe. He first appeared in Adventure Comics #342 (March 1966), and was created by Edmond Hamilton and Curt Swan. Within the context of the stories, Calamity King is a rejected member of the Legion of Super-Heroes.

Calamity King in other media
Calamity King appears in the Legion of Super Heroes episode "The Karate Kid", voiced by Alexander Polinsky.

Calendar Girl

Calendar Man

Calculator

Canterbury Cricket

The Canterbury Cricket, also known as Jeramey Chriqui, is a superhero appearing in DC Comics. The character first appeared in Flashpoint: The Canterbury Cricket #1 (August 2011), created by Mike Carlin and Rags Morales.

Chriqui first appeared in the Flashpoint timeline, where he was a University of Kent student and conman in Canterbury, England. When Wonder Woman and the Amazons invaded England, Chriqui took cover inside a church. When the church was bombed by an Invisible Jet, Jeramey makes a connection with a cricket. Jeramey emerged from the wreckage as a giant cricket with a new lease on life.

With his new abilities, he leads the Ambush Bugs, an insect-themed resistance group, though all but him die in a battle with the Amazons. He later joins Lois Lane's Resistance.

The Canterbury Cricket was adapted into the mainstream DC Universe in the "Watchmen" sequel "Doomsday Clock". He was stated to be a member of Knights, Inc., a team of heroes ordained by the Queen of England who protect the borders of the United Kingdom as its sanctioned superhero team.

Canterbury Cricket in other media
 Canterbury Cricket appears in Justice League: The Flashpoint Paradox, voiced by Dee Bradley Baker.
 Canterbury Cricket appears as a summonable character in the 2013 video game Scribblenauts Unmasked: A DC Comics Adventure.

Captain Atom

Captain Boomerang

Captain Cold

Captain Comet

Captain Marvel

Captain Marvel Jr.

Captain Nazi

Frankie Carbone
Frankie "Angel" Carbone is a character appearing in Batman: The Long Halloween (December 1996).

Frankie Carbone is a mobster who works for Maroni family. At some point, he was assaulted and defeated by Batman and later killed by serial killer Holiday.

Frankie Carbone in other media
Frankie appears in Gotham, portrayed by Danny Mastrogiorgio. He is the second-in-command to Sal Maroni, knowing each other for over 20 years. Debuting in "Arkham", he goes to investigate the stolen money in Bamonte's restaurant, finding Oswald Cobblepot inside the freezer, holding the bag containing Maroni's money. After telling own story, Cobblepot is accepted by Maroni to become a restaurant manager. Carbone begins to despise him for his rise in Maroni crime family. During the conflict between Maroni and Falcone (caused by Oswald's appearance in GCPD), he and Oswald go to wipe out Nikolai and his men in the storage. Frankie then tries to kill him with own men, unaware that they were already bought by Oswald, the latter despising him for his love of money and not a power and respect, ultimately killing him.

Carcharo
Carcharo is a fictional character appearing in American comic books published by DC Comics.

When Doctor Love experimented on the unborn children of Maria Montez and her sister, the experiments gave the child of Maria's sister shark-like characteristics. After a drowning attempt by his mother, Carcharo survived in the oceans where he gained the ability to control sharks.

Carcharo in other media
Carcharo appears in the Stargirl episode "Frenemies – Chapter Eight: Infinity Inc. Part Two". This version is a patient at the Helix Institute for Youth Rehabilitation.

Joseph Carver
Joseph Carver is a character appearing in American comic books published by DC Comics. He is a scientist who worked on experimenting on the Speed Force as a member of Black Hole.

Joseph Carver in other media
Joseph Carver appears in the sixth season of The Flash, portrayed by Eric Nenninger. This version is the leader of Black Hole, the CEO of McCulloch Technologies, and the husband of Eva McCulloch. He encountered resistance from Team Flash and CCPD, before being killed by his wife's mirror duplicate.

Aaron Cash

Aaron Cash is a corrections officer and one of Arkham Asylum's most respected security guards. Aaron Cash was created by Dan Slott and Ryan Sook and first appeared in Arkham Asylum: Living Hell #1 (2003). His hand was bitten off by Killer Croc and he sports a prosthetic hook in its place. Unlike many of his colleagues, he is neither mentally unwell nor corrupt and is a trusted ally of Batman.

Aaron Cash in other media
 Aaron Cash appears in the Batman: Arkham video game franchise, voiced by Duane R. Shepard, Sr.
 Aaron Cash makes cameo appearances in the first two issues of the miniseries Batman/Teenage Mutant Ninja Turtles Adventures.

Catwoman

Cerdian

Cerdian is an infant in the DC Universe.

The character, created by Dan Jurgens and Steve Epting, first appeared in Aquaman (vol. 5) #63 (January 2000).

Cerdian is the son of Tempest and Dolphin. He is not seen after Infinite Crisis and is confirmed to have died during that event in Titans (vol. 2) #15 (September 2009).

Ch'p

Chameleon Boy

Charybdis

Charybdis is a supervillain associated with Aquaman. Created by Peter David and Martin Egeland, he first appeared in Aquaman (vol. 5) #1 (August 1994).

Charybdis and his wife, Scylla, are international terrorists who attempt to kill Aquaman. When Scylla is killed, Charybdis is driven mad by grief. He uses his ability to suppress metahuman abilities to defeat Aquaman and attempts to absorb his powers to himself. However, he is unable to control his new ability to communicate with fish and falls into a pool of piranhas. Instead of being devoured, he melds with the piranhas, taking on many of their traits and taking the name the Piranha Man.

Doris Chase
Doris Chase was Adrian Chase's wife. The character, created by Marv Wolfman and George Pérez, first appeared in The New Teen Titans #29 (March 1983). Doris was killed (together with their two children) by a bomb meant for Adrian, planted at the direction of mob boss Anthony Scarapelli; this trauma caused her husband to become the Vigilante.

Doris Chase in other media
Doris Chase appears in Arrow, portrayed by Parveen Dosanjh. This version is killed by Simon Morrison posing as Adrian.

Cheetah

Chemo

Angela Chen
Angela Chen was created by Alan Burnett, Paul Dini and Bruce Timm, first appearing in Superman: The Animated Series episode "The Last Son of Krypton". She is based on Cat Grant and is voiced by Lauren Tom. Angela was a fast rising star of the Daily Planet and also hosted the popular TV news show "Metropolis Today".

In the Prime Earth continuity of comics, Angela Chen first appeared as part of The New 52 and DC Rebirth in Justice League of America: Vixen Rebirth #1 by Steve Orlando, Jody Houser and Jamal Campbell. She appeared in the comics as a talk show host.

Angela Chen in other media
 Angela Chen appears in the 2003 video game Superman: Shadow of Apokolips, voiced again by Lauren Tom.
 Angela never appeared on-screen but appeared in the Smallville: Season Eleven comics. She works as a field reporter for the TV channel GNN.
 Angela Chen appears in Justice League vs. Teen Titans, voiced by Laura Bailey.

Cherry Bomb
Cherry Bomb is a fictional character appearing in American comic books published by DC Comics.

In her panel within the pages of "The New Golden Age" #1, Gloria James is the daughter of a chemist named Professor Brian James who worked with Roy Lincoln in making a liquid that can open any lock. After her father was killed by criminals who raided the laboratory, Gloria learned that Roy Lincoln was the controversial superhero called Human Bomb. When Gloria offered to help, Roy turned her down as he can't control his powers and left to find Professor James' murderers. Having taken some lessons that made her an amateur chemist, Gloria attempted to recreate the formula that turned Roy Lincoln into Human Bomb. She succeeded where the volatite compound became known as 28-ORX where it blew up the laboratory. When Human Bomb returned to his laboratory, he found a disoriented Gloria among the rubble. Finding out what she has done, Human Bomb placed Gloria into one of his containment suits where she got some control over his powers as they track down the criminals responsible for Professor James' death where Gloria took on the name Cheerry Bomb. While being helped by Cherry Bomb to avoid the police, Human Bomb discovered that Gloria's powers were growing in a dangerous way causing Gloria to wear the containment suit all the time to keep her powers from discharging at the wrong time. At the time when Human Bomb was working on a way to cure Gloria, she mysteriously vanished one day. By the final issue of "Flashpoint Beyond", Cherry Bomb was among the 13 missing Golden Age superheroes that were in the Time Masters' capsules. When those capsules failed, they were all pulled back to their own time with history rewriting around them.

Cherry Bomb was among the missing sidekicks that found themselves on Childminder's island in the Diablo Triangle that was named Orphan Island. She assists Wing, Air Wave, and Robotman's creation Robbie the Robot Dog in saving Stargirl from the egg-shaped Child Collectors. She, Wing, Air Wave, and Robbie the Robot Dog take Stargirl to a cave where the other Lost Children are.

Cheshire

Chief

Chillblaine
Chillblaine is the name of different supervillains appearing in American comic books published by DC Comics. Each version of Chilblaine has a cold gun similar to that of Captain Cold.

Chillblaine I
The first Chillblaine is an unnamed man who worked for Captain Cold's sister Golden Glider. At the time when Golden Glider and Chillblaine were fighting Flash when he was eclipsed by Eclipso, Golden Glider became eclipsed and killed Chillblaine.

Chillblaine II
The second Chillblaine is an unnamed man who fought Flash twice. After being dragged into the beam of his cold gun, Chillblaine escaped from police custody and planned to enact his revenge during the New Year's Countdown. After dealing with his own personal crisis, Flash defeated Chillblaine.

Chillblaine III
The third Chillblaine is an unnamed man. He and his henchmen robbed a bank. Flash informed Jay Garrick, Impulse, Johnny Quick, and Jesse Quick about his different fights with the previous people that went by the name Chillblaine. They helped Flash defeat Chillblaine and his henchmen.

Chillblaine IV
The fourth Chillblaine is an unnamed man who was tracked down by John Fox and Linda Park at the time when John was filling in for Wally West. John and Linda learned that Chillblaine worked with Golden Glider before killing her. John and Linda tracked down Chillblaine to an aquarium where they fall into his trap. John brings Wally back to his time and they defeat Chillblaine.

Captain Cold later tracks Chillblaine down to Candyman's hideout and kills Chillblaine as a way to avenge his sister's death.

Chillblaine in other media
 Chillblaine appears in the Robot Chicken DC Comics Special, voiced by Matthew Senreich. This version is a member of the Legion of Doom.
 Chillblaine appears in The Flash, portrayed by Jon Cor. Introduced in the seventh season, this version is Mark Blaine, a former Ivo Laboratories scientist who was fired for creating a microchip that could used for cryogenic technology. He creates "cryo-bracelets" in an attempt to seek revenge and frame Killer Frost, who he sees as a kindred spirit, only to be defeated by her, arrested by the Flash, and incarcerated in Iron Heights Penitentiary. Blaine later gets out after turning state's witness and, as of the eighth season, starts dating Frost until she dies defeating Deathstorm. In the ninth season, Blaine joins the Red Death's Rogues in constructing the Cosmic Treadmill for her in exchange for help in resurrecting Frost. After the Flash appeals to his better nature however, Blaine betrays the Rogues and destroys the treadmill. While he is subsequently captured by them, he is later rescued by Team Flash.

King Chimera

Chris KL-99

Christina Chiles
Christina Chiles, a.k.a. Cyber-C.A.T., is a supervillain in the DC Universe.

The character, created by Jim Balent and Doug Moench, first appeared in Catwoman (vol. 2) #42 in 1997.

Within the context of the stories, Christina Chiles had been working on a cyber battle suit modeled after a cat and decided to test it against Catwoman, who had broken into the lab in which Christina worked. Despite the powers the suit gave her, Christina (now Cyber-C.A.T.) was beaten by Catwoman. Infuriated at her loss, Cyber-C.A.T. began a personal vendetta against Catwoman. As Catwoman managed to elude her, Cyber-C.A.T. became more and more fixated on tracking her down. Another confrontation with Catwoman resulted in failure because of the help of Catwoman's rival, the She-Cat.

Cyber-C.A.T. made one final attempt on Catwoman's life, but Catwoman had received her own suit of armor, which gave her powers on par with Cyber-C.A.T.'s, and finally destroyed the armor. Christina was taken into custody by the agency she worked for because of her unauthorized use of its technology.

Chris Kent

Chronos

Circe

Clayface

Clock King

Clown
The Clown (Lyle Corley) is a minor character appearing in American comic books published by DC Comics. The character, created by Cary Bates and Irv Novick, first appeared in The Flash #270 (February 1979). He is a serial killer who uses circus clown gimmicks in Central City, and a minor enemy of the Flash. The Clown is also partly responsible for Hunter Zolomon's transformation into Zoom, and is killed by Ashley Zolomon.

Clownhunter
Bao Pham is an American-Vietnamese vigilante living in the Narrows, who witnessed his parent's brutal deaths at the hands of the Joker at age twelve. As he grew up and watched the Clown Price of Crime's body-count rise, he came to believe Batman wasn't going far enough and that the criminal needed to die. Five years after his parents' death, the Joker waged war on Gotham, leading an endless army of criminals to attack Gotham. After watching some of his men burn down a comic book store, Bao finally decided to take matters into his own hands and became the Clownhunter. Using a baseball bat with a batarang attached to the end, he patrolled the Narrows and killed roughly twelve of Joker's men during the war.

With the aftermath of Joker's defeat, Batman confronted Boa at his room. Having heard that he'd been forced to fight his parents zombified bodies during one of the fights, Clownhunter berated the Dark Knight for destroying their bodies and for not killing the Joker directly. In response, Batman told him to give up the vigilante path and gave him the contact details of Leslie Thompkins, warning him that he'd be arrested if he killed any more of Joker's thugs.

Sometime afterwards, Clownhunter tracked down Harley Quinn and planned to murder her for her involvement with his parent's murder. As he prepared to attack, Batman subdued him. However, another vigilante called Ghost-Maker subdued the Dark Knight and brought them to an abandoned area of Arkham Asylum. Freed from his restraints, Ghost-Maker offered Bao the opportunity to kill Quinn without Batman's intervention, hoping to prove the Dark Knight his point. Though he planned to go through with it, he relented after Quinn apologized for her actions. Bao then left the asylum whilst they confronted Ghost-Maker.

Cluemaster

Cobalt Blue
Cobalt Blue is a fictional comic book supervillain, who appears in books published by DC Comics as an enemy of the Flash. He is an ancestor of the superhero Impulse and the supervillains Professor Zoom and Captain Boomerang.

Malcolm Thawne was the twin brother of Barry Allen. The doctor that delivered the twins had already accidentally killed a separate child that belonged to Charlene Thawne. To cover the mistake, he gave Malcolm to the Thawnes and told the Allens that one of the twins had been stillborn.

Malcolm's "parents" were con artists, passing off a healing salve that was actually used to cover the Thawnes' natural super abilities  Because of his clean-cut looks and demeanor, Malcolm was most often used to lure the unsuspecting victims. As an adult, he was in Central City and stumbled onto his twin brother, Barry Allen, by chance. Curious why there was another man with his face, he demanded the truth from his parents. They admitted everything, having been aware of the infant switch from the beginning. Malcolm refused to believe that his parents could be so heartless, and he tracked down the doctor who delivered him. The doctor confirmed the Thawnes' story and, in a rage, Malcolm murdered the doctor.

The matriarch of the Thawne family, Malcolm's grandmother, who also possessed the ability to control the "blue flame" (which was revealed to be a mystical ability passed down through the Thawne family) was disgusted at her son's pathetic use of the gift to con people. Malcolm, on the other hand, possessed the passion required to make full use of the ability. His grandmother trained him in the secret of the flame. Fueled by Malcolm's rage and jealousy at his twin for 'stealing his life', Malcolm fashioned a blue gem to contain the flame, which was capable of stealing Barry Allen's superspeed.

His first attempt ended in failure, and Malcolm was absorbed into the gem, only to re-emerge years later. By this time, Wally West had assumed the mantle of the Flash. Barry's death during the "Crisis on Infinite Earths" appeared to have cheated Malcolm out of his dreams of revenge on his brother. Instead, Malcolm focused on Allen's descendants traveling through time in a bid to exterminate them, starting with Wally West. Under the identity of Cobalt Blue, Malcolm ignited a family feud that endured for a millennium.

The feud came to a head in the late 30th century, where Barry Allen was living with his wife Iris. Wally West arrived to try to protect his uncle.  Flashes of all eras between the 20th and 30th centuries arrived soon after, all under the control of Thawne's spirit because they all were carrying a shard of the original Cobalt Blue gem. After defeating all the other Flashes, in the end, Wally West ended the menace of Cobalt Blue by running so fast that he skirted the edge of the Speed Force. Its power poured into the gem, and Thawne's spirit (and the gem itself) overloaded from the excess energy.

Despite the fact that there are supposed to be many Cobalt Blues between now and the 30th century, neither Malcolm or Cobalt Blue have appeared since the "Chain Lightning" arc. It is unknown if these timelines even exist following the events of Infinite Crisis.

Alternate versions of Cobalt Blue
Numerous others in the future have become Cobalt Blue. There would be one almost every century that would take over the mantle.

The Cobalt Blue of the 21st century wore a glass armor. Not much was seen of him, as he was defeated in about 30 seconds by a time travelling Jay Garrick and Iris West II.

The Cobalt Blue of this time had brutally murdered the Flash of that era's wife and had crippled his daughter, Sela. Eight months after this, the Flash killed Cobalt Blue. But his victory was short-lived as a child picked up the gem and, being consumed by its rage, killed the Flash.  However, a time-travelling Max Mercury and Sela Allen, who was now healed, returned the boy to normal.

In the 25th century, the roles of the Flash and Cobalt Blue were reversed. Now Chardaq Allen had taken the role of Cobalt Blue. Professor Zoom and Wally West defeated Chardaq and returned him to normal.

This Cobalt Blue almost ended the Allen bloodline when she infected Jace Allen with a virus. However, Jace's father Blaine, the then current Flash, sacrificed himself to save his son. Ten years later, Jace was the Flash. He and a time-travelling Jesse Quick defeated Cobalt Blue.

Coldcast

Coldcast is a metahuman who can manipulate electromagnetism for various effects in the DC Universe.

The character, created by Joe Kelly and Doug Mahnke, first appeared in Action Comics #775 (March 2001).

Within the context of the stories, Nathan Jones, using the name Coldcast, is a member of the Elite. He is recruited into the team by Manchester Black prior to the team encountering Superman in Libya After Superman defeats the team and Black's apparent suicide, Coldcast is recruited by Vera Black for a team that eventually becomes the Justice League Elite.

Coldcast in other media
Coldcast appears in Superman vs. The Elite, voiced by Catero Colbert.

Colossal Boy

Comedian

Commander Steel

Condiment King
The Condiment King is a supervillain who is generally used as comic relief. Although Bruce Timm and Paul Dini created Condiment King as a one-off joke character for Batman: The Animated Series, Chuck Dixon and Scott Beatty created their own version in Batgirl: Year One #8. He made a cameo in The Lego Batman Movie.

Buddy Standler
The Condiment King first appeared in the Batman: The Animated Series episode "Make 'Em Laugh" as stand-up comedian Buddy Standler, voiced by Stuart Pankin. He was brainwashed by the Joker into becoming Condiment King to ruin his reputation as retaliation for being spurned during a comedy contest the previous year. The character was a throwback to the Adam West Batman TV series in that he was a whimsical villain and made many condiment-based puns.

Buddy Standler made his comic book debut in Detective Comics #1000. This iteration is shown to have two henchmen named Salt and Pepper.

Mitchell Mayo
Mitchell Mayo is a criminal who operates as the Condiment King introduced in Batgirl: Year One. He was seen holding up a bank until he was defeated by Batgirl. He later made an appearance while committing a crime before being defeated by the Black Canary, the third Robin, and the Blue Beetle. While fighting him, Robin observes that the villain is potentially dangerous (if only because his condiment guns could cause anaphylactic shock), but his ludicrous nature prevents the Justice Department from taking him seriously. In the aftermath miniseries of the Final Crisis storyline, the Condiment King appears on General Immortus' side, having been given acidic vinegar from Professor Milo. He is seemingly killed after being betrayed and bludgeoned with his own guns by the Human Flame.

Equipment of the Condiment King
The Condiment King makes use of various condiments (sometimes capable of causing anaphylactic shock) as his weapons in his condiment gun. The condiments include mustard, ketchup, tabasco sauce, and vinegar.

Condiment King in other media
 The Buddy Standler incarnation of the Condiment King appears in The Lego Batman Movie as one of several villains recruited by the Joker.
 The Buddy Standler incarnation of the Condiment King appears in Lego Batman 3: Beyond Gotham, voiced by Nolan North.
 The Mitchell Mayo incarnation of the Condiment King appears as a "Rare" figure in the February 2016 World's Finest expansion set for the HeroClix collectible miniatures game.
 The Mitchell Mayo incarnation of the Condiment King appears as a playable character in Lego DC Super-Villains, voiced by Armin Shimerman. This version is a member of the Legion of Doom.
 Producer John Stephens has stated that he wanted to include the Condiment King in Gotham, but was reportedly denied due to the ridiculous nature of the character and him not fitting the overall tone of the show.
 The Mitchell Mayo incarnation of the Condiment King appears in Harley Quinn, voiced by Alan Tudyk. He first appeared in promotional artwork released for the show before appearing in the second season episode, "Thawing Hearts", competing against his rival Kite Man and Poison Ivy for a wedding venue. While Condiment King ultimately secures the venue after Ivy is called to assist elsewhere, in the episode "Something Borrowed, Something Green", she has her sentient man-eating plant Frank eat him and his fiancée so she can have the venue for herself and Kite Man.
 The Mitchell Mayo incarnation of the Condiment King appears in the DC Super Hero Girls episode "#WorkingStiff", voiced by Bobcat Goldthwait. This version is an obsessive perfectionist who has been fired from multiple restaurants.

Conduit

Confessor
Confessor is a fictional character appearing in American comic books published by DC Comics.

Confessor is a member of the Church of Blood. He serves as the group's interrogator

Confessor in other media
Confessor appears in Titans, portrayed by Noah Danby.

Congorilla

Core

Harriet Cooper

Harriet Cooper is the aunt of Dick Grayson in the DC Universe. The character was created by Bill Finger and Sheldon Moldoff, and first appeared in Detective Comics #328 (June 1964).

Within the context of the stories, Harriet Cooper is Dick Grayson's aunt who comes to live at Wayne Manor after Alfred Pennyworth's death. She involves herself in both Grayson's and Bruce Wayne's daily lives and, on occasion, comes close to uncovering their secret identities. When Alfred returns from the dead, she remains at Wayne Manor at his insistence. Over time, health problems reduce her activities and cause her to eventually leave Gotham City.

Some details from the television series (her last name, her status as a widow) were added to the comic stories in Detective Comics #373 (March 1968).

In September 2011, The New 52 rebooted DC's continuity. In this new timeline, Harriet has appeared in the ongoing series Gotham Academy.

Alternate versions of Harriet Cooper
Aunt Harriet appeared in Tiny Titans #33 (December 2010).

Harriet Cooper in other media
 Aunt Harriet appears in the 1960s television series Batman, portrayed by Madge Blake. 
 Aunt Harriet appears in the Batman '66 tie-in comics. 
 Aunt Harriet appears in the animated films Batman: Return of the Caped Crusaders and Batman vs. Two-Face, voiced by Lynne Marie Stewart.

Cosmic Boy

Count Vertigo

Gerald Crane
Gerald Crane is a character in DC Comics and a father of Jonathan Crane, first appearing in Year One: Batman/Scarecrow, published in July 2005.

Gerald had a brief relationship with Karen Keeny which resulted in the son's birth, but as they were not married, Karen's mother and grandmother raised Jonathan as theirs, not even hiding their contempt for Karen, Gerald and Jonathan. Years later, Gerald moved to Gotham City, married and had two kids, finding a job in construction. His son (as Scarecrow) came back in attempt to kill him, but was prevented by Batman.

In The New 52 (a reboot of DC Universe continuity), he appears in Batman (vol. 2) #1, where he is portrayed as a villainous doctor who experimented on his son and locked him in a small dark room. Gerald Crane suffered a heart attack and died, which left his son trapped inside the dark test chamber and wasn't discovered until days later by the cops when Dr. Crane's disappearance was reported.

Gerald Crane in other media
Gerald Crane appears in Gotham, portrayed by Julian Sands. He is a biology professor, Jonathan's father and Karen's husband who died in a fire accident year ago. Gerald has a severe form of pyrophobia for most of his life (inheriting this trait from his father), a factor which prevented him to save her. He took wife's body and crashed a car to make it seem that she died in a car crash. Debuting in "The Fearsome Dr. Crane", Gerald tries to develop an anti-fear formula to cure his and son's fear, by kidnapping several people with various phobias with the help of his son and unnamed accomplice. He kidnaps Scottie Mullen (who runs a phobia support group), in trying to test her fear and later killing her to harvest the adrenal glands and acquire the levels of cortisol, a hormon which causes the fear and adrenalin. Gordon and Bullock prevent this and save Scottie. In "The Scarecrow", Gerald injects himself, believing that he conquered fear and injects it in his son, but is soon killed by Gordon and Bullock. His son is taken to the hospital, but develops a severe fear of scarecrows.

Ned Creegan
Ned Creegan is a supervillain in DC Comics.

Ned Creegan is a crook who was tipped off by Billy Blabbermouth about valuable jewels that are being used for scientific experiments. He breaks into the house of a scientist named Nevil Long, steals the jewels, and takes them to a fence. The sale is interrupted by Batman and Robin, who battle the two. As Robin takes down the fence, Batman sees that Ned is becoming transparent because of the jewels, leaving him a skeleton. After Robin refers to him as Bag O' Bones, Ned defeats Batman and Robin with his electrified touch. Ned then returns to Nevil Long's house and has him determine what is wrong with him. Nevil reveals that he has been experiment with surviving nuclear war. After giving the temporary antidote to Ned, Nevil reveals that his Bag O' Bones form loses a day in his life for every time he is in that form. Agreeing to work with Ned, Nevil sends him out with some antidote pills to test the outcome. As Bag O' Bones is robbing a museum, Batman and Robin attack, where he loses the antidote pills in the scuffle. When he starts to get weaker, Bag O' Bones surrenders and states that the jewels were being experimented on by Nevil Long. Batman and Robin go to confront Nevil. After a scuffle with irradiated animals, Batman and Robin apprehend Nevil and have him give the antidote pills to Bag O' Bones. After he agreed to sell his secrets to the United States government to avoid legal trouble, Nevil is present at Bag O'Bones' trial, where he is sentenced to 20 years in prison. When Bag O' Bones states to Nevil that he will not survive the sentence in his condition, Nevil stated that he would not be in this position if he had not broken into his laboratory in the first place.

Ned Creegan returns with new powers as the Cyclotronic Man, where he is hired by Tobias Whale of the 100 to kill Black Lightning and Superman. He lures them out by capturing Jimmy Olsen. The Cyclotronic Man was defeated by Black Lightning and Superman.

At Gotham State Penitentiary, Warden Brewster informs Ned Creegan that his parole request has been denied. Having become the One Man Meltdown, he goes into a frenzy and escapes from Gotham City Penitentiary. This causes Warden Brewster to call for Batman. After tying in the thefts for the radioactive items, Batman brings along the Outsiders to help track down the One Man Meltdown. During the fight at S.T.A.R. Labs, the One Man Meltdown takes Halo as a hostage while using her aura abilities to his advantage. Katana defeats Halo, as it is revealed that Warden Brewster has been experimenting on him. Returning to Gotham State Penitentiary, the Outsiders and the One Man Meltdown prevent Warden Brewster from destroying Ned Creegan's medical records and hand him over to the police. Batman tells the One Man Meltdown that he will be there when his parole request is approved.

Ned Creegan in other media
Ned Creegan appears in the Black Lightning episode "The Book of Occupation Chapter One: Birth of Blackbird", portrayed by Chase Alexander. While he maintains his force field abilities, this version also has disintegration and telekinesis abilities and was part of the same program that gave Commander Carson Williams his power-mimicking powers according to Peter Gambi's research sometime after serving time for carjacking a minivan. In addition, he also called himself the Cyclotronic Man or Cyclotronic for short. Creegan fought alongside his trainer Carson in the war until he became disillusioned and sided with Markovia. When Cyclotronic Man attacked the A.S.A. facility that Anissa Pierce and Reverend Jeremiah Holt were given a tour of, he destroyed a wall and took down some guards until Carson arrived. When Carson fought Cyclotronic Man, he fought him to a standstill as Carson started to copy his abilities. The fight ends when Carson wraps his legs around Cyclotronic Man's neck and snaps it. Carson then introduced himself to those taking the tour, while reporting to Percy Odell that Cyclotronic Man and the Markovian soldiers with him have been eliminated. In the episode "The Book of Occupation Chapter Three: Agent Odell's Pipe-Dream," it was suspected by Lynn that Cyclotronic Man was the carrier for a man-made virus that the Markovians used to infect the metahumans in the A.S.A.'s custody. This was confirmed by Helga Jace in a discussion with Lynn in the episode "The Book of Markovia Chapter Three: Motherless ID."

Creeper

Crimson Avenger

Crispus Allen

Crush

Xiomara Rojas was born to an unknown human mother and Czarnian bounty hunter Lobo. Mysteriously, she crash-landed in the middle of the Burning Man festival in the Black Rock Desert wrapped in a sentient chain known as Obelus. Obelus wouldn't allow her to be touched, until she was discovered by the couple David and Lisa Rojas, who would adopt the child. The family would homeschool Xiomara, and would move a lot due to their debts and legal issues.

After seeing a report of Lobo fighting Superman, she immediately recognized her true father. She confronted her adopted parents, who had previously told her that her birth parents were superheroes protecting the universe. She ran away, and after being attacked by white supremacists at a gas station, returned to find her mobile home burnt to the ground, with her parents dead and Obelus missing.

She began to fight in illegal rings, where she took the name Crush. She was then approached by Robin, who invited her to the Teen Titans. She accepted, believing Robin could help her solve her parents' murder.

After the Teen Titans were enrolled as students in the newly formed Titans Academy, Crush quits the team after feeling she has no place in the school.

After leaving the Teen Titans, Crush would travel space to hunt for her father's bounty and confront him.

By the events of Dark Crisis, Crush has seemingly rejoined the Teen Titans.

Cyborg

Cyborg Superman

Cyborgirl

LeTonya Charles was a young woman who had destroyed her body with the drug Tar, but was granted a second chance when her aunt, Sarah Charles, one of the scientists who helped repair Cyborg, saved her with powerful cybernetic implants. Rather than use her newfound gifts for good, LeTonya chose to focus on personal gain as Cyborgirl. She became a member of Villainy, Inc., teaming up with several seasoned Wonder Woman villains. She and her teammates tried to overthrow Skartaris, but were stopped by Wonder Woman.

When the government rounded up villains and sent them to the planet Salvation, she handed herself over to the Justice League to avoid being exiled. Soon after, Cyborgirl joined the Cyborg Revenge Squad and was one of several such beings to wage an attack against Victor Stone at S.T.A.R. Labs. Stone avoided Cyborgirl's electromagnetic attack, but succeeded in defeating her through sheer force.

Powers and abilities of Cyborgirl
Cybernetic enhancement: Because of the implants that her aunt gave her, Cyborgirl has the same powers as Cyborg. Much of her body has been replaced with advanced cybernetics. This grants her a variety of powers, including superhuman durability, superhuman speed, superhuman agility, superhuman reflexes,
superhuman stamina, superhuman strength, enhanced senses and energy projection.

Cyborgirl in other media
 When Justice League was pitched to the Kids' WB network, the lineup originally included three young members as protégés for the Justice League. The members would have been Robin, Impulse and an original character described as a teenage female version of Cyborg (Cyborgirl or Natasha Irons). The promo is viewable on the fourth disc of the Justice League Season One boxed set.
 A character based on Cyborgirl named Laura Washington / Cyber-Woman appears in the Arrow season 5 episode "Invasion!", portrayed by Erica Luttrell. Dr. Laura Washington, nicknamed Cyber-Woman by Rory Regan, is a doctor that artificially augmented herself using technology stolen from Van Horn Industries. Augmenting herself cybernetically, Laura Washington stole a regulator from Van Horn Industries and implanted it in herself. Sometime after, Team Arrow tracked Washington down to a warehouse, hoping to take the regulator for their own means. Wild Dog took her on, but she shot blasts of energy at him, forcing him to dodge them. Before she could accurately hit him, Wild Dog was saved by the Flash. The Flash proceeded to beat up Laura, before allowing Supergirl to hit her, sending Laura at him for a finishing blow.

Cyclone

Cyclone Kids
The Cyclone Kids are fictional characters appearing in American comic books published by DC Comics.

Amelia "Sisty" Hunkel is the daughter of Ma Hunkel. Mortimer "Dinky" Jibbet is the younger brother of Scribbly Jibbet and Ma Hunkel's neighbor. When Ma operated as Red Tornado, Sisty and Dinky became her sidekicks known as the Cyclone Kids where they helped her fight crime in their neighborhood.

Later on in their life, Sisty and Dinky got married and joined up with Old Justice. In addition, they have a niece who operates as Cyclone.

References

 DC Comics characters: C, List of